The twenty-fifth series of the British television drama series Grange Hill began broadcasting on 29 January 2002, before ending on 28 March 2002 on BBC One. The series follows the lives of the staff and pupils of the eponymous school, an inner-city London comprehensive school. It consists of eighteen episodes.

Cast

Pupils

Teachers

Others

Episodes

DVD release
The twenty-fifth series of Grange Hill has never been released on DVD as of 2014.

Notes

References

2002 British television seasons
Grange Hill